Carmenta pyralidiformis, the boneset borer, is a moth of the family Sesiidae. It was described by Francis Walker in 1856. It is known from the United States, including Arkansas, Illinois, Maryland, Massachusetts, Michigan, Missouri, New Jersey, Ohio and Virginia.

The wingspan is about 21 mm.

The larvae feed on the roots of bonesets and thoroughworts (Eupatorium spp.).

References

External links
Moth Photographers Group. Mississippi State University.

Sesiidae
Moths described in 1856